Pierre Horsfall  (born c. 1938) is a retired hotelier and politician from Jersey. He was a member of the States Assembly from 1975 for 27 years, and as the President of Policy and Resources committee he was Jersey's most senior politician.

On 24 June 2021, it was announced that Horsfall would be a founding member of the soon-to-be-launched Jersey Liberal Conservatives party, founded by former External Relations Minister Philip Bailhache.

References 

 
 
 

Senators of Jersey
Commanders of the Order of the British Empire
British Aircraft Corporation
Aeronautical engineers
1930s births
Living people
Year of birth uncertain